Marrubiu (Marrùbiu in the Sardinian language) is a comune (municipality) in the Province of Oristano in the Italian region Sardinia, located about  northwest of Cagliari and about  south of Oristano.

Marrubiu borders the following municipalities: Ales, Arborea, Morgongiori, Santa Giusta, Terralba, Uras.

References

Cities and towns in Sardinia